Richard Chwedyk (born 1955) is a science fiction author.  In 2003, he won the 2002 Nebula Award for Best Novella for his story "Brontë's Egg."

Chwedyk's first published story was "Getting Along with Larga," which was the first winner of the ISFiC Writer's contest in 1986.  In 1988, he won the contest again with his story "A Man Makes a Machine," which went on to be published as Chwedyk's first professional sale in Amazing Stories in November, 1990.

In addition to writing fiction, Chwedyk has also published a number of poems and has coordinated poetry slams in Chicago, where he makes his home.

In 2000, Chwedyk oversaw the writer's workshop at Chicon 2000, the Worldcon, and has overseen several other writers workshops at science fiction conventions over the years, often running the workshop at Windycon.

Richard Chwedyk is married to Chicago poet, Pamela Miller Chwedyk.

In 2009, he donated his archive to the department of Rare Books and Special Collections at Northern Illinois University.

Bibliography

Short fiction 

Stories

 "Auteur theory" F&SF 95/1 [564] (Jul 1998)

Saurs stories
 "Brontë's Egg" F&SF, August 2002
 "In Tibor's Cardboard Castle" F&SF, October/November, 2004
 "Orfy" F&SF, September/October, 2010
 "The Man Who Put the Bomp" F&SF, March/April, 2017

Poetry
 "A few kind words for A E van Vogt" (2002).  Published in Tales of the Unanticipated 23 (2002) and in Year's Best SF 8
 "Rich and Pam Go to Fermilab and Later See a Dead Man", Strange Horizons, 17 March 2003

References

External links
Richard Chwedyk's website

1955 births
Living people
American male novelists
American male poets
American male short story writers
American science fiction writers
American short story writers
The Magazine of Fantasy & Science Fiction people
Nebula Award winners